Physolinum is a genus of green algae in the family Trentepohliaceae. The only species in the genus, Physolinum monilia, is currently regarded as a synonym of Trentepohlia rigidula.

References

Ulvophyceae genera
Trentepohliaceae